A Lokpal ( lokapāla, "defender of people" or "People's Friend") is an anti-corruption authority or body of ombudsman who represents the public interest in the Republic of India. The current Chairperson of Lokpal is Pradip Kumar Mohanty. The Lokpal has jurisdiction over central government to inquire into allegations of corruption against its
public functionaries and for matters connected to corruption. The Lokpal and Lokayuktas Act was passed in 2013 with amendments in parliament, following the Jan Lokpal movement led by Anna Hazare in 2010. The Lokpal is responsible for enquiring into corruption charges at the national level while the Lokayukta performs the same function at the state level. The age of Lokpal (chairperson or member) on the date of assuming office as the chairperson or a member should not be less than 45 years.

History 
The term "Lokpal" was coined by Dr. L.M.Singhvi in 1963. The concept of a constitutional ombudsman was first proposed in parliament by Law Minister Ashoke Kumar Sen in the early 1960s. The first Jan Lokpal Bill was proposed by Adv Shanti Bhushan in 1968 and passed in the 4th Lok Sabha in 1969, but did not pass through the Rajya Sabha. Subsequently, 'lokpal bills' were introduced in 1971, 1977, 1985, again by Ashoke Kumar Sen, while serving as Law Minister in the Rajiv Gandhi cabinet, and again in 1989, 1996, 1998, 2001, 2005 and in 2008, yet they were never passed. Forty five years after its first introduction and after ten failed attempts, the Lokpal Bill was finally enacted in India on 18 December 2013 after the tenth attempt. President gave his assent to Lokpal and Lokayuktas Act on 1 January 2014.

The Lokpal Bill provides for the filing, with the ombudsman, of complaints of corruption against the prime minister, other ministers, MPs,and group A, B, C and D officers of the central government. The first Administrative Reforms Commission (ARC) recommended the enacting of the Office of a Lokpal, convinced that such an institution was justified, not only for removing the sense of injustice from the minds of citizens, but also to instill public confidence in the efficiency of the administrative machinery.

Following this, the Lokpal Bill was, for the first time, presented during the fourth Lok Sabha in 1968, and was passed there in 1969. However, while it was pending in the Rajya Sabha, the Lok Sabha was dissolved, and thus the bill lapsed.

The bill was revived several times in subsequent years, including in 2011. Each time, after the bill was introduced to the House, it was referred to a committee for improvements, to a joint committee of parliament, or to a departmental standing committee of the Home Ministry. Before the government could take a final stand on the issue, the house was dissolved again. Several conspicuous flaws were found in the 2008 draft of the Lokpal Bill. The basic idea of a lokpal is borrowed from the Office of the Ombudsman, which has the Administrative Reforms Committee of a Lokpal at the centre, and Lokayukta in the states.

Anna Hazare started agitation in Delhi to get this bill passed, and it did pass on 27 December 2011, around 9:30, with some modifications. These were proposed as the Jan Lokpal Bill. However, Hazare and his team, as well as other political parties, claimed that the Lokpal Bill passed was weak, and would not serve its intended purpose. So the proposed bill by the ruling Congress Party has yet to be accepted in the Rajya Sabha. As of 29 December 2011, the bill has been deferred to the next parliamentary session, amid much controversy and disruption by the LJP, RJD and SP parties. The media at large, and the opposition parties, claimed the situation had been staged.

The apex Institution primarily created to inquire and investigate complaints relating to allegation of corruption involving public functionaries and elected representatives, finally was formed in March 2019 with the appointment of its Chairperson and members.

Qualification
As of March 2019, and ever since the related Act of Parliament was passed in India. Retired Supreme Court judge Pinaki Chandra Ghose is appointed as the first Lokpal of India by a committee consisting of Prime Minister Narendra Modi and Chief Justice of India Ranjan Gogoi and Speaker of the Lok Sabha Sumitra Mahajan on 23 March 2019 whereas the members are appointed w.e.f 27 March 2019.  

According to The Lokpal and Lokayuktas Act, 2013, the organisation consists of one Chairperson and a maximum of eight other members. 
 Out of those eight members four members are judicial members who are or have been a Judge of the Supreme Court or a Chief Justice of a High Court 
 Remaining four members being non-judicial members are people of impeccable integrity and outstanding ability having special knowledge and expertise of not less than twenty-five years in the matters relating to anti-corruption policy, public administration, vigilance, finance including insurance and banking, law and management.
 Minimum fifty per cent of the Members will be from Scheduled Castes / Scheduled Tribe / Other Backward Classes / Minorities and women.

Current Composition

Jan Lokpal Bill movement 

Jan Lokpal Bill (Citizen's Ombudsman Bill) is a draft anti-corruption bill drawn up by prominent civil society activists, seeking the appointment of a Jan Lokpal, an independent body that would investigate corruption cases, complete the investigation within one year and conduct trials for the case within the next year.

Drafted by Justice Santosh Hegde (a former Supreme Court Judge and former Lokayukta of Karnataka), Prashant Bhushan (a Supreme Court Lawyer) and Arvind Kejriwal (a RTI activist), the draft Bill envisaged a system in which a corrupt person found guilty would go to jail within two years of the complaint being made and his ill-gotten wealth confiscated. It also sought power for the Jan Lokpal to prosecute politicians and bureaucrats without requiring government permission.

Retired IPS officer Kiran Bedi and others, like Anna Hazare, Swami Agnivesh, Sri Sri Ravi Shankar, and Mallika Sarabhai are also members of the movement, called India Against Corruption. Its website describes the movement as "an expression of collective anger of people of India against corruption." It goes on to state: "We have all come together to force/request/persuade/pressurize the Government to enact the Jan Lokpal Bill. We feel that if this Bill were enacted it would create an effective deterrence against corruption."

Anna Hazare, an anti-corruption crusader, began a fast-unto-death, demanding that this bill, drafted by Civil Society, be adopted. The website of the India Against Corruption movement calls the Lokpal Bill of the government an "eyewash", and hosts a critique of that government bill. It also lists the difference between the bills drafted by the government and civil

The Lokpal and Lokayuktas Act, 2013 
The historic Lokpal and Lokayuktas Act, 2013 was passed by Indian Parliament paving the way for establishment of a Lokpal (Ombudsman) to fight corruption in public offices and ensure accountability on the part of public officials, including the Prime Minister, but with some safeguards.

Lokpal will consist of a chairperson and a maximum of eight members, of which 50% will be judicial members 50% members of Lokpal shall be from SC/ST/OBCs, minorities and women. Selection of chairperson and members of Lokpal through a selection committee consisting of PM, Speaker of Lok Sabha, leader of opposition in Lok Sabha, Chief Justice of India or a sitting Supreme Court judge nominated by CJI. Eminent jurist to be nominated by President of India on basis of recommendations of the first four members of the selection committee "through consensus". Lokpal's jurisdiction will cover all categories of public servants. All entities (NGOs) receiving donations from foreign source in the context of the Foreign Contribution Regulation Act (FCRA) in excess of Rs 10 lakh per year are under the jurisdiction of Lokpal. Centre will send Lokpal bill to states as a model bill. States have to set up Lokayuktas through a state law within 365 days.

 Lokpal will have power of superintendence and direction over any central investigation agency including CBI for cases referred to them by the ombudsman.
 A high-powered committee chaired by the PM will recommend selection of CBI director. The collegium will comprise PM, leader of opposition in Lok Sabha and Chief Justice of India PM has been brought under purview of the Lokpal, so also central ministers and senior officials.
 Directorate of prosecution will be under overall control of CBI director. At present, it comes under the law ministry.
 Appointment of director of prosecution to be based on recommendation of the Central Vigilance Commission.
 Director of prosecution will also have a fixed tenure of two years like CBI chief.
 Transfer of CBI officers investigating cases referred by Lokpal with the approval of watchdog.
 Bill incorporates provisions for attachment and confiscation of property acquired by corrupt means, even while prosecution is pending.
 Bill lays down clear timelines for preliminary enquiry and investigation and trial. Provides for special courts Public servants will not present their view before preliminary enquiry if the case requires 'element of surprise' like raids and searches.
 Bill grants powers to Lokpal to sanction prosecution against public servants.
 CBI may appoint a panel of advocates with approval of Lokpal, CBI will not have to depend on govt advocates.
On 15 May 2018, Mukul Rohtagi (Former Attorney General of India) has been appointed as an eminent jurist in the selection panel of Lokpal.

List of Chairpersons of the Lokpal Committee

See also 
 The Lokpal and Lokayuktas Act, 2013
 Lokayukta
 Citizen's Charter and Grievance Redressal Bill, 2011
 Jan Lokpal Bill
 2011 Indian anti-corruption movement

References

Further reading 
 http://www.thehindu.com/news/national/mukul-rohatgi-appointed-eminent-jurist-in-selection-panel-for-lokpal/article23891565.ece
 http://www.hindu.com/thehindu/holnus/002200804051550.htm
 India Together – the Lokpal cycle
 Times of India article
 Anna to move SC against possible police crackdown
 Lokpal bill infographics
 Suggested amendments to the Bill
 Consensus views on Lokpal
 
 

Anti-corruption measures in India
Anti-corruption agencies
Ombudsman posts